Sunday Akindare (born 29 May 1966) is a Nigerian journalist  and currently serves as the Nigeria Minister of Youth & Sports. He was formerly the Executive Commissioner, Stakeholder Management, Nigerian Communications Commission (NCC), an appointment he was nominated for by President of the Federal Republic of Nigeria Muhammadu Buhari in August 2016. He is the current minister of youth and sports.

Education
Dare received his secondary school education at Baptist High School in Jos; a city in the Middle Belt of Nigeria from 1978 to 1983. Shortly afterwards he studied for an Advanced level education at Oyo State College of Arts and Science, Ile-Ife, Nigeria. He then gained admission to Ahmadu Bello University where he graduated with a Bachelor of Science (BSc.) honors in International studies in 1991. His quest for knowledge motivated him to delve further into obtaining a Master of Arts (MA) in Law and Diplomacy from the University of Jos, Plateau state Nigeria in 1996.

Dare was opportune to be selected as a Freedom Forum Fellow and Visiting Scholar at the School of Journalism – New York University (NYU) in 1998. His professional excellence positioned him for another highly esteemed international opportunity; Harvard Nieman Journalism Fellowship at Harvard University where he enrolled for Media and Public Policy studies(2000-2001). 

In 2011 Dare once again distinguished himself among his contemporaries from across the world and won the Reuters Foundation Journalism Research Fellowship at the University of Oxford, the United Kingdom where he contributed to the body of knowledge in the field of media, and researched "New Media and Citizen Journalism in Africa – A Case Study: Using New Media Tools and Citizen Journalism to Investigate Corruption in Nigeria."

Career
Sunday Dare has over two-decade of journalism experience spanning over 25 years before 2016 when he was appointed as Executive Commissioner, Stakeholder Management, Nigerian Communications Commission (NCC) where he is charged with the responsibility of managing the NCC's interface with public and private sector stakeholders.

Before his appointment at NCC, he was the brain behind the birth of Social Media Clinic (SMC), a Media/Information Technology (New Media) program aimed at providing information as well as educating private citizens on IT development and sensitising the members of the public on the usage of new media as a tool for building responsive society. He managed the aforementioned role together with serving as the Chief of Staff / Special Adviser on media to former Lagos State Governor, Asiwaju Bola Ahmed Tinubu.

In 2009, Dare was appointed Senior Special Assistant (Media) to the Minister of Information and Communications, while serving in this capacity he managed decisions on all subject matter that revolved around media and communications, as well as public information dissemination and media policies that fell within the jurisdiction of the Ministry. Additional responsibilities in his portfolio included supervision of operations of the Nigerian Communications Commission and feedback to high-ranking officials and the Minister of Information and providing recommendation on prospect and pitfalls in Nigeria's telecommunications industry. Dare also played an instrumental role in the meetings that were held between the leadership of NCC and top executives of the Ministry of Information and Communications. Dare's iconic moment in the Ministry was being a member of the Minister's advisory team that initiated and executed the sale of the 2.3 GHz spectrum frequency in 2014.

Dare served as Chief, Hausa Service, African Division at Voice of America (VOA) in Washington, DC between 2001 and 2009, in this capacity he managed multifarious portfolios. Other than managing the daily production of radio and online broadcast programs, he ideated, designed and implemented the acquisition of modern Information Technology and Telecoms gadgets for production and distribution activities such as news-gathering, content storage, program distribution etc. to expand content capacity and reach; as well as increase existing target audience. He also led a team of eleven International Journalists based in Washington DC; alongside twenty-four news correspondent based in West Africa for Voice of America.

In his early days as a Journalist, Dare multitasked as a correspondent with several foreign publications including The Nation magazine in New York; as well as working with the European backed Fourth Estate magazine as a production editor during the military interregnum in Nigeria. Other journalistic roles Dare took on during the military era in Nigeria include being a pioneer member of the Nigerian weekly magazines The News and Tempo; serving as an Editor, a Tempo magazine and a pioneer Online Editor/General.

Honour and recognition
Dare is a well decorated professional with numerous award to his name. He has been honoured both locally and internationally, including being recognised as one of the fifty Leading Nigerians during the Nigeria's Golden Jubilee anniversary celebration in North America. He also emerged the winner of the Voice of America Meritorious Honour Award 2009 in recognition of his sterling leadership and professional contributions in Africa and diaspora. Additionally, Dare was listed as a member of International Committee to Protect Journalists Citation in 2000 in New York City in recognition of his spiritedness as a journalist.

See also
Cabinet of Nigeria

References

1966 births
Living people
Ahmadu Bello University alumni
University of Jos alumni
Nigerian media personalities